Dirk Dammann (born 14 August 1967) is a German former professional footballer who played as a defender.

Career
Dammann played professionally for FC St. Pauli. He later played in the Oberliga Hamburg with VfL Stade, before retiring in May 2007.

References

External links
 

1967 births
Living people
German footballers
FC St. Pauli players
Bundesliga players
2. Bundesliga players
Association football defenders
FC Eintracht Norderstedt 03 players
People from Stade
Footballers from Lower Saxony